Polémica en el bar is an Argentine comedy program broadcast by Telefe, and also produced by Endemol. It stars Mariano Iudica, Miguel Angel Rodriguez, Miguel Granados, Noelia Marzol, Horacio Pagani, Anita Martinez, Tristan, Rodrigo Lussich, Guillermo Coppola and Joaquin Flamini, premiered on Sunday, 6 March 2016.

Premise
Polémica en el bar features a number of comedians gathered in a bar, sitting in a round table. They discuss topics such as football, politics and show business, and start controversies around them.

The show is host by Mariano Iudica.

Production
The original Polémica en el bar was created and produced by Gerardo Sofovich, who died in 2015. The new series was launched as an homage, and it is directed by his son, Gustavo Sofovich. The comedian Miguel Ángel Rodríguez reprised the role of "Minguito", an indigent played by his father-in-law Juan Carlos Altavista. The program is led by Rodríguez and Mariano Iúdica, and also includes  Guillermo Coppola, Rodrigo Lussich, Anita Martínez, Horacio Pagani, Migue Granados, Noelia Marzol and Joaquín Fammini.

The program includes guest appearances of famous people as well. Some people invited to the program were Carlos Calvo, Susana Giménez, Carlos Balá and Lionel Messi.

Reception
The program got 11.4 rating points during the premiere episode. It was considered a good performance, and it doubled the rating of the programs at the other TV networks.

The newspaper La Nación reviewed the program and considered it of regular quality. It considered that, whereas the original program had tight scripts, the modern one relies heavily on improvisations. The review also considered that the program is too loaded with nostalgia of the original program.

Cast and characters

References

External links
Official website

Telefe original programming
Argentine comedy television series
Television series reboots
2016 Argentine television series debuts